Valiabad-e Shiri (also Romanized as Valīābād-e Shīrī; also known as Valīābād-e Chenār) is a village in Teshkan Rural District, Chegeni District, Dowreh County, Lorestan Province, Iran. At the 2006 census, its population was 232, in 49 families.

References 

Towns and villages in Dowreh County